Amritsar district is one of the twenty three districts that make up the Indian state of Punjab. Located in the Majha region of Punjab, the city of Amritsar is the headquarters of this district.

As of 2011, it is the second most populous district of Punjab (out of 23), after Ludhiana.

History
During British Rule Amritsar District was part of Lahore Division and was administratively subdivided into 3 tehsils namely - Amritsar, Ajnala and Tarn Taran. However, as part of the partition of India in 1947 Amritsar district was separated from the rest of the division and awarded to India. However, some parts like Patti & Khem Karan falls in the Lahore District but due to partition, these towns became the part of Amritsar District. During the partition period, the Muslim population of the district, some 46%, left for Pakistan while Hindus and Sikhs from West Punjab in newly created Pakistan migrated in the opposite direction. The Sikhs and Hindus (37% and 15.38%) were a majority in the Amritsar district constituting about 52% of the population together before the partition of 1947.

Climate
The official weather station for the city is the civil aerodrome at Rajasansi. Weather records here date back to 15 November 1947.

Demographics

According to the 2011 census Amritsar district has a population of 2,490,656, roughly equal to the nation of Kuwait or the US state of Nevada. The number of literates in Amritsar district is 1,684,770 (67.6%), with 932,981 (70.8%) male literates and 751,789 (64.1%) female literates. The effective 7+ literacy of the district is 76.27%. The sex ratio of 889 females for every 1,000 males. The total Scheduled Caste population is 770,864 (30.95%) of the population. There were 488,898 households in the district in 2011.

Religion 

According to the 2011 census, Sikhs make up about 69% of the population while Hindus 28%, with a small minority of Christians (2%) and Muslims. Sikhs predominate in rural areas (over 90%), while Hindus and Sikhs are in nearly-equal numbers in urban areas. Christianity is growing rapidly especially among Dalits, while Islam, once the major religion in the district, is now insignificant.

Language 

At the time of the 2011 census, 94.30% of the population spoke Punjabi and 4.80% Hindi as their first language. Hindi-speakers almost all live in urban areas.

District administration 
 The Deputy Commissioner, an officer belonging to the Indian Administrative Service is in charge of general administration of the district. He is generally a middle-level IAS officer of Punjab Cadre. As the District Magistrate, he also effectively the head of the police force. The Deputy Commissioner of Amritsar is Gurpreet Singh Khaira, appointed in 2020. 
 Administration of departments such as public works, health, education, agriculture, animal husbandry, etc. is headed by district officers who belong to various Punjab state services.
 The Commissioner of Police, an officer belonging to the Indian Police Service is responsible for maintaining law and order in the district. He is assisted by officers of the Punjab Police Service and other Punjab Police officials.
 The Divisional Forest Officer, an officer belonging to the Indian Forest Service is responsible for the management of forests and wildlife in the district. He is assisted by officers of the Punjab Forest Service, other Punjab Forest officials, and Punjab Wildlife officials.
 A Municipal corporation is responsible for the management of public works and health systems in the city of Amritsar. The municipal corporation is a democratic body of councillors and is presided over by the Mayor, who is elected by the councillors. At present, there are more than 70 councillors.

Amritsar District Borders the Pakistani Punjab Districts of Lahore, Kasur, Shiekhupura along the Ravi River Tarn Taran District to the South along Sutlej River, Kapurthala District along the Beas River and Gurdaspur District to the North.

Tehsils in Amritsar district 

There are four tehsils in Amritsar district as per 2011 census. 
5 majitha    6 lopoke at chogawan

Politics

MLA

References

External links

Amritsar

 
Districts of Punjab, India
1947 establishments in India